Abu ol Qiyefeh (also Romanized as Abū ol Qīyefeh) is a village in Shavur Rural District, Shavur District, Shush County, Khuzestan Province, Iran. At the 2006 census, its population was 235, in 43 families.

References 

Populated places in Shush County